Julie Newmar (born Julia Chalene Newmeyer, August 16, 1933) is an American actress, dancer, and singer, known for a variety of stage, screen, and television roles. She is also a writer, lingerie designer, and real-estate mogul. She won the Tony Award for Best Featured Actress in a Play for her role as Katrin Sveg in the 1958 Broadway production of The Marriage-Go-Round and reprised the role in the 1961 film version. In the 1960s, she starred for two seasons as Catwoman in the television series Batman (1966–1967). Her other stage credits include the Ziegfeld Follies in 1956, Lola in Damn Yankees! in 1961, and Irma in Irma la Douce in 1965 in regional productions.

Newmar appeared in the music video for George Michael's 1992 single "Too Funky" and had a cameo as herself in the 1995 film To Wong Foo, Thanks for Everything! Julie Newmar. Her voice work includes the animated feature films Batman: Return of the Caped Crusaders (2016) and Batman vs. Two-Face (2017), for which she reprised her role as Catwoman 50 years after the original television series.

Early life
Newmar was born in Los Angeles, California on August 16, 1933, as the eldest of three children born to Don and Helen (Jesmer) Newmeyer. Her father was head of the physical education department at Los Angeles City College and had played American football professionally in the 1920s with the 1926 Los Angeles Buccaneers of the National Football League. Her Swedish-French mother was a fashion designer who used Chalene as her professional name and later became a real-estate investor.

Newmar has two younger brothers, Peter Bruce Newmeyer (born 1935) and John A. Newmeyer (born 1942), a writer, epidemiologist, and winemaker. She began dancing at an early age, and performed as a prima ballerina with the Los Angeles Opera beginning at age 15.

Career

Early work

Newmar began appearing in bit parts and uncredited roles in films as a dancer, including a part as the "dancer-assassin" in Slaves of Babylon (1953) and the "gilded girl" in Serpent of the Nile (1953), in which she was clad in gold paint. She danced in several other films, including The Band Wagon (also 1953) and Demetrius and the Gladiators (1954). She also worked as a choreographer and dancer for Universal Studios beginning at age 19. Her first major role, billed as Julie Newmeyer, was as Dorcas, one of the brides in Seven Brides for Seven Brothers (also 1954). Her three-minute Broadway appearance as the leggy Stupefyin' Jones in the musical Li'l Abner in 1956 led to a reprise in the film version released in 1959. She was also the female lead in a low-budget comedy, The Rookie (also 1959).

Newmar had first appeared on Broadway in 1955 in Silk Stockings, which starred Hildegarde Neff and Don Ameche. She also appeared in the film, The Marriage-Go-Round (1961), which starred James Mason and Susan Hayward (Newmar had earlier developed the role of the Swedish vixen onstage and won a Tony Award for Best Supporting Actress for the Broadway version upon which the film was based). She later appeared on stage with Joel Grey in the national tour of Stop the World – I Want to Get Off and as Lola in Damn Yankees! and Irma in Irma La Douce. and in Mackenna's Gold (1969). She also appeared in a pictorial in the May 1968 issue of Playboy magazine, which featured Playmate Elizabeth Jordan.

Television work

Newmar's fame stems mainly from her television appearances. Her statuesque form and height made her a larger-than-life sex symbol, most often cast as a temptress or Amazonian beauty, including an early appearance in sexy maid costume on The Phil Silvers Show. She starred as Rhoda the Robot on the television series My Living Doll (1964–1965), and is known for her recurring role on the 1960s television series Batman as the villainess Catwoman. (Lee Meriwether played Catwoman in the 1966 feature film and Eartha Kitt in the series' final season.) Newmar modified her Catwoman costume—now in the Smithsonian Institution—and placed the belt at the hips instead of the waist to emphasize her hourglass figure.

In 1962, Newmar appeared twice as the motorcycle-riding, free-spirited heiress Vicki Russell on Route 66, filmed in Tucson ("How Much a Pound Is Albatross") and in Tennessee ("Give the Old Cat a Tender Mouse"). She guest-starred on The Twilight Zone as the devil in "Of Late I Think of Cliffordville", F Troop ("Yellow Bird" in 1966) as a girl kidnapped as a child and raised by Native Americans, Bewitched ("The Eight-Year Itch Witch" in 1971) as a cat named Ophelia given human form, The Beverly Hillbillies as a Swedish actress who stays with the Clampetts to learn their accents and mannerisms for a role, and Get Smart as a double agent assigned to Maxwell Smart's apartment posing as a maid. In 1967, she guest-starred as April Conquest in an episode of The Monkees ("Monkees Get Out More Dirt", season 1, episode 29), in which the main characters all fall in love with her, and was the pregnant Capellan princess, Eleen, in the Star Trek episode "Friday's Child". In 1969, she played a hit woman in the It Takes a Thief episode "The Funeral is on Mundy" with Robert Wagner. In 1983, she reprised the hit-woman role on Hart to Hart, Wagner's later television series, in the episode "A Change of Hart". In the 1970s, she had guest roles on Columbo and The Bionic Woman.

Later roles

Newmar appeared in several low-budget films during the next two decades. She guest-starred on TV, appearing on The Love Boat, Buck Rogers in the 25th Century, CHiPs, and Fantasy Island. She was seen in the music video for George Michael's "Too Funky" in 1992, and appeared as herself in a 1996 episode of Melrose Place. 

In 2003, Newmar appeared as herself in the television movie Return to the Batcave: The Misadventures of Adam and Burt alongside former Batman co-stars Adam West, Burt Ward, Frank Gorshin, and Lee Meriwether. Julia Rose played Newmar in flashbacks to the production of the television series. However, due to longstanding rights issues over footage from the Batman TV series, only footage of Meriwether taken from the feature film was allowed to be used in the television movie. In 2016, she provided the voice of Catwoman in the animated film Batman: Return of the Caped Crusaders.  In 2017, she reprised her role in the animated sequel Batman vs. Two-Face.  Newmar also appeared on The Home and Family Show in May 2016, where she met Gotham actress Camren Bicondova who portrays a younger Selina Kyle.

In 2019, Newmar played the role of Dr. Julia Hoffman (replacing the late Grayson Hall) in the audio drama miniseries, Dark Shadows: Bloodline.

Inventor and entrepreneur
In the 1970s, Newmar received two U.S. patents for pantyhose and one for a brassiere. The pantyhose were described as having "cheeky derriere relief" and promoted under the name "Nudemar". The brassiere was described as "nearly invisible" and in the style of Marilyn Monroe.

Newmar began investing in Los Angeles real estate in the 1980s. A women's magazine stated, "Newmar is partly responsible for improving the Los Angeles neighborhoods on La Brea Avenue and Fairfax Avenue near the Grove."

Personal life
Newmar married J. Holt Smith, a lawyer, on August 5, 1977, and moved with him to Fort Worth, Texas, where she lived until their divorce in 1984. She has one child, John Jewl Smith (born February 25, 1981), who has a hearing impairment and Down syndrome.

Newmar has Charcot–Marie–Tooth disease, an inherited neurological condition that affects one in 2,500 Americans.

A legal battle with her neighbor, actor Jim Belushi, ended amicably with an invitation to guest-star on his sitcom According to Jim in an episode ("The Grumpy Guy") that poked fun at the feud.

An avid gardener, Newmar initiated at least a temporary ban on leaf blowers with the Los Angeles City Council.

Newmar has been a vocal supporter of LGBT rights; her brother, John Newmeyer, is gay. In 2013, she was awarded a lifetime achievement award from the Gay and Lesbian Elder Housing organization in Los Angeles.

In popular culture
In 2012, Bluewater Comics released a four-issue comic miniseries titled The Secret Lives of Julie Newmar.

Filmography

Film

Television
{| class="wikitable sortable"
|-
! Year
! Title
! Role
! Notes
|-
| 1957 || The Phil Silvers Show || Suzie || Episode: "The Big Scandal"
|-
| 1959 || Omnibus || || Episode: "Malice in Wonderland"
|-
| 1960 || Adventures in Paradise || Venus || Episode: "Open for Diving"
|-
| 1961 || The Defenders || Brandy Gideon Morfoot || Episode: "Gideon's Follies"
|-
| 1962 || Route 66 || Vicki Russell || 2 episodes
|-
| 1963 || The Twilight Zone || Miss Devlin || Episode: "Of Late I Think of Cliffordville"
|-
| 1963 || The Danny Kaye Show || Herself || Episode: "1.12"
|-
| 1964 || The Greatest Show on Earth || Willa Harper || Episode: "Of Blood, Sawdust, and a Bucket of Tears"
|-
| 1964–1965 || My Living Doll || Rhoda Miller || Nominated – Golden Globe Award for Best TV Star – Female  
|-
| 1965 || Vacation Playhouse || Kris Meeker || Episode: "Three on an Island"
|-
| 1966–1967 || Batman || Miss Kitka / Catwoman, Minerva Matthews || 13 episodes
|-
| 1966 ||   The Beverly Hillbillies  || Ulla Bergstrom || Episode: "The Beautiful Maid"
|-
| 1966 || F Troop || Cinthia Jeffries/Yellow Bird || Episode: "Yellow Bird"
|-
| 1967|| The Monkees || April Conquest || Episode: "Monkees Get Out More Dirt"
|-
| 1967 || Star Trek: The Original Series || Eleen || Episode: "Friday's Child"
|-
| 1968 || Get Smart || Ingrid || Episode: "The Laser Blazer"
|-
| 1969 || It Takes a Thief || Susannah Sutton || Episode: "The Funeral Is on Mundy"
|-
| 1970 || McCloud || Adrienne Redman || Episode: "Portrait of a Dead Girl"
|-
|1970–1972 ||  Love, American Style || Various || 4 episodes
|-
| 1971 || NBC Children's Theatre || Herself || Episode: "Super Plastic Elastic Goggles"
|-
| 1971 || Bewitched || Ophelia || Episode: "The Eight Year Itch Witch"
|-
| 1973 || Columbo || Lisa Chambers || Episode: "Double Shock"
|- 
| 1975 || The Wide World of Mystery || || Episode: "The Black Box Murders"
|-
| 1975 || McMillan & Wife || Luciana Amaldi || Episode: "Aftershock"
|-
| 1976 || The Bionic Woman || Claudette || Episode: "Black Magic"
|-
| 1976 || Monster Squad || Ultra Witch || Episode: "Ultra Witch"
|-
| 1978 || Jason of Star Command || Queen Vanessa || 2 episodes
|-
| 1979 ||  The Love Boat || Marla Samms || Episode: "The Reunion/Haven't I Seen You?/Crew Confessions" 
|-
| 1980 ||  Buck Rogers in the 25th Century || Zarina || 2 episodes
|-
| 1982 || The Powers of Matthew Star || Nian || Episode: "The Triangle"
|-
| 1982|| CHiPs || Cora Dwayne || Episode: "This Year's Riot"
|-
| 1983 || Fantasy Island || Doralee || Episode: "King of Burlesque/Death Games"
|-
| 1983 || Hart to Hart  || Eve || Episode: "A Change of Heart"
|-
| 1984 || High School U.S.A. || Stripper || TV pilot
|-
| 1985 || Half Nelson || Herself || Episode: "The Deadly Vase"
|-
| 1995 || Hope & Gloria || Herself || Episode: "Whose Poppa?
|-
| 1996 || Melrose Place || Herself || Episode: "Triumph of the Bill"
|-
| 1998 || Maggie || Catwoman || Episode: "If You Could See What I Hear"
|-
| 2006 ||  According to Jim|| Julie || Episode: "The Grumpy Guy"
|-
| 2010 || Batman: The Brave and the Bold || Martha Wayne (voice) || Episode: "Chill of the Night!"
|-
|}

Stage creditsAlice in Wonderland (1940) Silk Stockings (1955)Ziegfeld Follies (1956) (closed on the road) Li'l Abner (1956)The Marriage-Go-Round (1958)Damn Yankees (1961) Once There Was a Russian (1961)Stop the World – I Want to Get Off (1963)Irma La Douce (1964) Damn Yankees (1965) Dames at Sea (1970) In the Boom Boom Room (1982) Li'l Abner'' (1998)

References

External links

 
 
 
 
 
 
 Julie Newmar at the University of Wisconsin's Actors Studio audio collection

!colspan="3" style="background:#C1D8FF;"| Batman role
|-

1933 births
Living people
20th-century American actresses
20th-century American businesspeople
20th-century American businesswomen
20th-century American comedians
20th-century American inventors
20th-century American singers
20th-century American women singers
21st-century American actresses
21st-century American comedians
Actresses from Los Angeles
American female dancers
American women singers
American film actresses
American musical theatre actresses
American people of French descent
American people of Swedish descent
American television actresses
American voice actresses
American women comedians
Comedians from California
Dancers from California
Inkpot Award winners
American LGBT rights activists
Singers from California
Tony Award winners
Women inventors